Nitish Roy is an Indian film art director, production designer,  and costume designer in Hindi cinema and a Bengali Film Director, who is also known for his work with art cinema directors, Shyam Benegal, Mrinal Sen and Govind Nihlani, Hindi mainstream cinema, directors like Rajkumar Santoshi, as well as international directors like Mira Nair and Gurinder Chadha.
His work (production design, art direction) for Oscar winning Hollywood blockbuster Gladiator fetched international fame for him.
Beside art direction, production design and film direction he is an internationally acclaimed architect who has created several film cities such has Ramoji Film City (Hyderabad) Innovative Film city (Bengaluru),Prayag Film City (Kolkata) and several theme parks, amusement parks, museum not only in India but also in countries like Singapore etc.

Filmography
 As production designer/ art director

 Kharij (1982)
 Mandi (1983)
 Party (1984)
 Khandhar (1984)
 Trikaal (1985)
 Tasveer Apni Apni (1985)
 Genesis (1986)
 New Delhi Times (1986)
 Ek Pal (1986)
 Aghaat (1986)
 Susman (1987)
 Tamas (1987)
 Bharat Ek Khoj (1988)
 Salaam Bombay! (1988) 
 Parinda (1989)
 Drishti (1990)
 Ghayal (1990)
 Jo Jeeta Wohi Sikandar (1992)
 Suraj Ka Satvan Ghoda (1993)
 Nightfall (2000)
 Pukar (2000)
 Gladiator (2000)
 Lajja (2001)
 23rd March 1931: Shaheed (2002)
 Maine Gandhi Ko Nahin Mara (2005)
 Fanaa (2006)
 Bride and Prejudice (2004)
 Halla Bol (2008)
 Good Luck! (2008)
 Praktan (2016)
 Mujib - The Making of a Nation (2022)

 As Director
 Ak poshla brishti 
 Tobu mone rekho 
 Jamai no 1 
 Heartbeat - Hindi 
 Gosainbaganer Bhoot (Bengali) (2011) - Director
 Jole Jongole (2012)
 Mahakash Kando (Bengali) (2012) - Director
 Tadanto 2015)
 Buddhu Bhutum (Bengali) (2017) -Director

Awards
 1983: National Film Award for Best Art Direction: Kharij
 1984: National Film Award for Best Art Direction: Mandi
 1991: National Film Award for Best Art Direction: Lekin
 1991: Filmfare Best Art Direction Award: Ghayal

References

External links
 
 

Indian production designers
Living people
Indian art directors
Indian costume designers
21st-century Indian film directors
Artists from Kolkata
Government College of Art & Craft alumni
University of Calcutta alumni
20th-century Indian designers
Filmfare Awards winners
21st-century Indian designers
Film directors from Kolkata
Best Production Design National Film Award winners
Year of birth missing (living people)